Hubert B. "Hub" Collins (April 15, 1864 – May 21, 1892) was an American professional baseball player. He was a second baseman and left fielder in Major League Baseball from 1886 to 1892 with the Louisville Colonels and Brooklyn Bridegrooms/Grooms.

Biography
Collins was born in Louisville, Kentucky. He started his professional baseball career in the minor leagues in 1885, and he started his major league career with the Louisville Colonels of the American Association in 1886. Near the end of the 1888 season, he was purchased by the Brooklyn Bridegrooms.

Collins was the National League leader in runs scored in 1890 with Brooklyn. For his career, he compiled a .284 batting average, a 117 OPS+, 653 runs scored, 319 runs batted in, and 335 stolen bases. He was considered to be very fast.

In April 1892, Collins became ill with typhoid fever. He died in Brooklyn the following month at age 28.

See also
 List of Major League Baseball annual doubles leaders
 List of Major League Baseball annual runs scored leaders
 List of baseball players who died during their careers

References

External links

1864 births
1892 deaths
Major League Baseball second basemen
Louisville Colonels players
Brooklyn Bridegrooms players
Brooklyn Grooms players
Columbus Stars (baseball) players
Savannah (minor league baseball) players
Baseball players from Louisville, Kentucky
Infectious disease deaths in New York (state)
Deaths from typhoid fever